Zaduszniki  is a village in north-central Poland, located in the administrative district of Gmina Wielgie, within Lipno County, Kuyavian-Pomeranian Voivodeship.

References

Zaduszniki